ABAD may refer to:

Amyloid-β peptide (Aβ) binding alcohol dehydrogenase
ABAD, a television transmitter in Alice Springs, Australia, which broadcasts the television station ABD (TV station)
ABAD (statutory corporation), is a public legal entity to carry out socially oriented projects in Azerbaijan.

See also
Abad (disambiguation)